Dozin' at the Knick is a recording of the Grateful Dead performing live in concert at the Knickerbocker Arena in Albany, New York. It was recorded March 24–26, 1990, and was released in 1996.  The album was certified Gold by the RIAA on March 28, 2000.  Fans of the Dead frequently refer to the album as "Dosin" at the Knick.

The three concerts were subsequently released in their entirety on the following releases:
March 24, 1990 : Combination of this release plus  Without a Net, Spring 1990 and Postcards of the Hanging
March 25, 1990 : Spring 1990 (The Other One)
March 26, 1990 : Spring 1990

Track listing

Disc one

March 26 – set one:
"Hell in a Bucket" (Barlow, Mydland, Weir) – 6:08
"Dupree's Diamond Blues" (Hunter, Garcia) – 5:36
"Just a Little Light" (Barlow, Mydland) – 4:45
March 24 – set one:
"Walkin' Blues" (Johnson, arr. Weir) – 6:11
March 25 – set one:
"Jack-A-Roe" (trad., arr. Grateful Dead) – 4:14
"Never Trust A Woman" (Mydland) – 7:06
"When I Paint My Masterpiece" (Dylan) – 5:02
March 26 – set one, continued:
"Row Jimmy" (Hunter, Garcia) – 10:26
"Blow Away" (Barlow, Mydland) – 11:14

Disc two

March 24 – set two:
"Playing in the Band" (Hunter, Hart, Weir) – 10:08 →
"Uncle John's Band" (Hunter, Garcia) – 10:01 →
"Lady with a Fan" (Hunter, Garcia) – 6:35 →
"Terrapin Station" (Hunter, Garcia) – 6:45 →
"Mud Love Buddy Jam" (Grateful Dead) – 7:53 →
"Drums" (Hart, Kreutzmann) – 9:41 →
"Space" (Garcia, Lesh, Weir) – 9:39 →

Disc three

March 24 – set two, continued:
"Space" (Garcia, Lesh, Weir) – 1:03 →
"The Wheel" (Hunter, Garcia) – 4:45 →
"All Along the Watchtower" (Dylan) – 7:45 →
"Stella Blue" (Hunter, Garcia) – 8:32 →
"Not Fade Away" (Holly, Petty) – 7:24
March 24 – encore:
"And We Bid You Goodnight" (trad., arr. Grateful Dead) – 2:21
March 25 – set two:
"Space" (Garcia, Lesh, Mydland, Weir) – 1:31 →
"I Will Take You Home" (Mydland) – 4:17 →
"Goin' Down the Road Feeling Bad"(trad., arr. Grateful Dead) – 6:59 →
"Black Peter" (Hunter, Garcia) – 9:08 →
"Around and Around" (Berry) – 5:57
March 26 – encore:
"Brokedown Palace" (Hunter, Garcia) – 5:20

Personnel
Jerry Garcia – guitar, vocals
Bob Weir – guitar, vocals
Phil Lesh – bass guitar
Brent Mydland – keyboards, vocals
Bill Kreutzmann – drums
Mickey Hart – drums

Recording dates
Disc 1
Track 4 recorded on March 24
Tracks 5-7 recorded on March 25 (later remixed and released on Spring 1990 (The Other One))
Tracks 1-3 and 8-9 recorded on March 26 (later remixed and released on Spring 1990)
Disc 2 recorded on March 24
Disc 3
Tracks 1-6 recorded on March 24
Tracks 7-11 recorded on March 25 (later remixed and released on Spring 1990 (The Other One))
Track 12 recorded on March 26 (later remixed and released on Spring 1990)

Two additional tracks from March 24 were also released: "Desolation Row" on Postcards of the Hanging, and "One More Saturday Night" on Without A Net.

Charts
Album – Billboard

References

Grateful Dead live albums
1990 live albums
Grateful Dead Records live albums
Warner Music Group live albums